Sphyriidae is a family of copepods belonging to the order Siphonostomatoida.

Genera:
 Driocephalus Raibaut, 1999
 Lophoura Kölliker, 1853
 Norkus Dojiri & Deets, 1988
 Opimia Wilson, 1908
 Paeonocanthus Kabata, 1965
 Periplexis Wilson, 1919
 Sphyrion Cuvier, 1830
 Sphyrion Milne Edwards, 1840
 Tripaphylus Richiardi, 1878

References

Copepods